Mouly Surya is an Indonesian film director and screenwriter.

Beginning her career as assistant director and screenwriter in local film productions, Surya rose to prominence in 2008 for her directorial debut the psychological thriller Fiksi. which won her the Citra Award for Best Director. She won a second Best Director award at the 38th Citra Award for her satay Western Marlina the Murderer in Four Acts in 2017. As of 2020, she remains the first and only woman director to have won the award.

AFI Fest

Asia-Pacific Film Festival

Asia-Pacific Screen Awards

Asian Academy Creative Awards

Bandung Film Festival

Cannes Film Festival

Cinemanila International Film Festival

Citra Awards

Five Flavours Film Festival

Hong Kong International Film Festival

Indonesian Film Academy Awards

International Film Festival Rotterdam

International Istanbul Film Festival

Jakarta International Film Festival

Jogja-NETPAC Asian Film Festival

Las Palmas Film Festival

Luxembourg City Film Festival

Maya Awards

Sundance Film Festival

Tempo Film Festival

Tokyo FILMeX

References

External links 

 

Surya, Mouly